Geraldine Batista Roman (born April 23, 1967) is a Filipina journalist and politician serving as the Representative of Bataan's 1st district since 2016. She is the first transgender person elected to the Congress of the Philippines. 

She was named as one of the 100 Leading Global Thinkers of 2016 by US-based Foreign Policy magazine; one of "13 Inspiring Women of 2016" list by Time magazine.

Biography
Geraldine Roman is the second of four children born into the family of politicians Herminia Roman and Antonino Roman, Jr. She was teased by her classmates but her father taught her to be confident.

Roman attended the basic education unit of Ateneo de Manila University for her elementary and high school studies. For her collegiate studies, she attended the University of the Philippines Diliman. She managed to secure a scholarship to pursue journalism at the University of the Basque Country in Spain and attained two master's degrees. She worked in Spain as a senior editor for the Spanish News Agency before returning to the Philippines in 2012 to take care of her father, who was seriously ill by that time.

Political career

Congress
During the 2016 Philippine elections, Roman ran under the Liberal Party banner for the position of 1st District Representative for Bataan in the House of Representatives. She competed against Hermosa mayor Danilo Malana of Aksyon Demokratiko and won with more than 62% of the total votes and became the first ever transgender congresswoman in the Congress of the Philippines. Roman succeeded the incumbent, her mother Hermina Roman, who had a limited term.

She, along with other elected lawmakers (collectively known as "equality champs"), launched the passage of the anti-discrimination bill on the basis of sexual orientation and gender identity (now known as the SOGIE Equality Bill) through a speech in the House of Representatives that garnered international support for LGBT rights in the Philippines. She also filed bills regarding eco-tourism, livelihood enhancements, agriculture advancements, health, and education, which were the advocacies of her family, and were focused on the first district of Bataan. She was named as one of the "13 Inspiring Women of 2016" by Time magazine in October 2016. She left the Liberal Party in May 2017 and transferred to PDP–Laban, the current ruling political party of the Philippines, to hasten the House passage of the bills that she supported. In September 2017, the SOGIE Equality Bill passed unanimously in the House of Representatives, after 17 years of political limbo, with no lawmakers voting against it. In January 2018, Roman, along with the House Speaker, filed House Bill 6595 (the Civil Partnership Bill), which seeks to legalize civil unions, regardless of gender. In February, Roman became the first transgender official of the Armed Forces of the Philippines. In August 2018, she filed the Regional Investment and Infrastructure Council Act, which sought to create special economic zones in Luzon. In September, Roman became the first committee chair of the newly created House Committee on Disaster Management. In October, she again pushed for the same-sex civil union bill, adding that the "sky will not fall" if the bill is passed. During the same month, she filed her certificate of candidacy for reelection in her district. In November 2018, during the first meeting of the House Committee on Disaster Management which she chairs, Roman prioritized the rehabilitation of the war-torn Islamic City of Marawi.

In the 2019 Philippine elections, Roman ran under the PDP–Laban banner for the position of 1st District Representative for Bataan in the House of Representatives. She competed against Emelita Justo Lubag of Katipunan ng Demokratikong Pilipino and won with 91% of the total votes.

Committee Memberships

 Veterans Affairs and Welfare, Chairperson
 Women and Gender Equality, Vice Chairperson
 Appropriations, Member of the Majority
 Climate Change, Member of the Majority
 Poverty Alleviation, Member of the Majority
 Sustainable Development Goals, Member of the Majority

House Measures Authored

 HB05225

AN ACT MANDATING THE PROVISION OF FREE WI-FI INTERNET ACCESS IN PUBLIC AREAS

Status: Republic Act RA10929 enacted on 2017-08-02

 HB05563

AN ACT DECLARING APRIL 21 OF EVERY YEAR A SPECIAL NONWORKING HOLIDAY IN THE MUNICIPALITY OF ORANI, PROVINCE OF BATAAN, IN COMMEMORATION OF ITS FOUNDING ANNIVERSARY, TO BE KNOWN AS "ORANI FOUNDATION DAY"

Status: Republic Act RA11145 enacted on 2018-11-09

 HB06178

AN ACT DECLARING JANUARY 11 OF EVERY YEAR A SPECIAL NONWORKING HOLIDAY IN THE PROVINCE OF BATAAN IN COMMEMORATION OF ITS FOUNDING ANNIVERSARY, TO BE KNOWN AS " BATAAN FOUNDATION DAY "

Status: Republic Act RA11138 enacted on 2018-11-09

 HB07525

AN ACT INCREASING THE MONTHLY PENSION OF SENIOR VETERANS THEREBY AMENDING RA 6948, AS AMENDED

Status: Republic Act RA11164 enacted on 2018-12-20

 HB08636

AN ACT INSTITUTIONALIZING A NATIONAL INTEGRATED CANCER CONTROL PROGRAM AND APPROPRIATING FUNDS THEREFOR

Status: Republic Act RA11215 enacted on 2019-02-14

 HB08794

AN ACT DEFINING GENDER-BASED SEXUAL HARASSMENT IN STREETS, PUBLIC SPACES, ONLINE, WORKPLACES, AND EDUCATIONAL OR TRAINING INSTITUTIONS, PROVIDING PROTECTIVE MEASURES AND PRESCRIBING PENALTIES THEREFOR

Status: Republic Act RA11313 enacted on 2019-04-17

Political positions

Federalism
Roman expressed her support for a federal form of government in the Philippines, but stated that she will introduce a clause that aims to guarantee the country's territorial integrity as she perceives that a federal system without such clause will lead to separatism due to the country's various ethnic groups, geographies, and regionalism. She cited the Spanish federal system as a possible reference for the Philippines' federal prospects.

Habeas corpus
Roman voted to approve a bill to reinstate the death penalty in the Philippines during its final reading on March 29, 2017, which met criticism online. She explained that she needed to compromise in order for her other advocacies and projects to push through. Earlier, she expressed opposition to the bill and called for the respect of the rights of convicts for reformation. Roman held a survey to gauge the views of her constituents in first district of Bataan and 85 percent of participants in a survey she conducted favored death penalty.

Same-sex marriage
Roman is the vice-chairperson of the Women And Gender Equality Committee of the Philippine House of Representatives. She supports same-sex civil unions for the Philippines, but said the first priority should be an anti-discrimination law, followed by a revision of the family code. She believes that at the present time, a marriage equality bill will not pass in Congress, due to the present status quo, which is why campaigning for it should be a top priority in the coming decades. In September 2017, the SOGIE Equality Bill passed in the House. In late 2017, Roman filed a civil union bill that caters to both heterosexual couples and non-heterosexual couples. The bill is backed by the majority of lawmakers in the House of Representatives, including the House Speaker.

Health services
Roman is a member of the Health Committee of the House of Representatives. She has filed a Cancer Institute bill in the House which was passed into law last February of this year as well as a Caregiver's bill. Roman supports the Mental Health Law, which was passed in 2017. She has filed a Hospitals Classification Bill which seeks to standardize the equipment, facilities, and services of hospitals on the basis of their level of classification.

War veterans' rights
Roman is an advocate for war veteran rights in the Philippines. She is the incumbent Chairperson for the Veteran Affairs and Welfare Committee in the House of Representatives. She has filed a bill seeking to increase the monthly pension of Filipino war veterans.

Tourism
Roman is an avid fan of history, culture, and the environment. She stated that her love for culture and the environment developed at home and was polished during her almost 20 years of stay in Spain, where she learned a lot about history and received two master's degrees. She has filed bills for the protection and conservation of numerous tourist sites in the first district of Bataan.

Education
Roman supports higher education in the Philippines. She has filed the Unified Student Financial Assistance System for Tertiary Students (UNIFAST) bill in the House of Representatives. Additionally, she has filed a bill which seeks to mandate the government to open all of its books to the people via online library.

Indigenous people's rights
Roman has filed a bill seeking to increase the representation of indigenous peoples in the Subic Bay Metropolitan Authority, which is near her home province of Bataan.

Agriculture and aquaculture
Roman has filed bills on the sustainability of agriculture and aquaculture in the province of Bataan. She has also filed the re-allotment of public lands and urban lands for agricultural lands.

Military career 
Roman is the first transgender military officer and reservist of the Armed Forces of the Philippines commissioned as Lieutenant Colonel.

Personal life
In the 1990s, Roman underwent sex reassignment surgery, had her name legally changed, and legally changed her gender to "female".

Roman's partner Alberto is a Spaniard residing in Spain; they are not married. Aside from her native Tagalog, she also speaks English, Spanish, French and Italian. She is member of the Philippine Academy of the Spanish Language. She is a practicing Catholic.

Awards and recognitions
100 Leading Global Thinkers of 2016 by US-based Foreign Policy magazine
Part of "Inspiring Women of 2016" list by Time magazine

References

1967 births
Filipino expatriates in Spain
Filipino journalists
21st-century Filipino politicians
Filipino Roman Catholics
Members of the House of Representatives of the Philippines from Bataan
Filipino LGBT politicians
Liberal Party (Philippines) politicians
Living people
People from Bataan
Transgender politicians
Transgender women
University of the Basque Country alumni
University of the Philippines alumni
Women members of the House of Representatives of the Philippines
LGBT Roman Catholics
LGBT legislators
Ateneo de Manila University alumni